Prudential Steamship Corporation was a shipping company founded in 1933 in New York City by Stephan Stephanidis.
Prudential Steamship Corporation operated the Prudential Lines.  Prudential Lines main routes was from the United States to Mediterranean ports. The Prudential Lines was never successful and was always near bankruptcy. Prudential Lines was active in supporting the World War II efforts. At its peak in the 1960s Prudential Lines owned and operated two tankers, and five cargo ships. In 1960 the Prudential Steamship Corporation was sold to Spyros Skouras and his family. In 1969 the Prudential Lines merged with Grace Lines, which continued to operate the fleet as the Prudential Grace Line.

History 
Stephan Stephanidis was born in Greece and immigrated to America. In 1933 he started the Prudential Steamship Corporation with one old cargo ship. Prudential Steamship Corporation operated US charter ships during World War II. Prudential Steamship Corporation made a number of management errors starting in the 1950s that kept it near bankruptcy. Fellow Greek, Spyros Skouras, loaned Stephanidis money to keep Prudential Steamship Corporation in operations. Spyros Skouras was a motion picture and film executive. He became the president of the 20th Century-Fox from 1942 to 1962.  When Stephan Stephanidis died in 1960, Spyros S. Skouras became the owner of Prudential Steamship Corporation due to the large loan he had many to the firm. Spyros Solon Skouras son, Spyros S. Skouras, became the head of Prudential Steamship Corporation. Spyros S. Skouras had founded Admiralty Enterprises, Inc. for ships owned by the family and as the management firm of the Prudential Lines. In 1970, Grace Line was sold to the Prudential Lines for $44.5 million, with the merged company renamed Prudential Grace Line. Prudential Grace Line was sold to Delta Steamship Lines in 1978. Subsequently, Delta Steamship Lines was itself acquired and consolidated by Crowley Maritime in 1982.  The sale did not end Prudential Steamship Corporation financial and management problems. In 1978 Plato A. Skouras took the family company to court, with claims for mismanagement, in Skouras v. Admiralty Enterprises, Inc.
In 1981 Prudential Lines near bankruptcy, the United States Government gave the firm a 10 year $2.6 million loan.

In 1981 to raise funds Prudential Lines sold its South American shipping operations, of seven ships, for $75 million to Delta Steamship Lines, Inc. a subsidiary of Holiday Inns, Inc. In 1986 Prudential Lines went into involuntary Chapter 11 bankruptcy by three of its creditors. Asbestos-related claims also were added to the bankruptcy filing.

Admiralty Enterprises, Inc.
Admiralty Enterprises, Inc. was a holding company that operated subsidiary companies. The subsidiary companies were World Wide Tankers, Inc., Prudential Lines, and Skouras Lines. In 1966 Admiralty Enterprises founded the SMC Shipping Corporation to aid the troubled Prudential Lines.  SMC Shipping Corporation financed the order of five new ships, type Lighter Aboard Ship or LASH. World Wide Tankers, Inc. was founded on Jan. 13, 1949 in California.

Some World Wide Tankers Inc - Skouras Lines 	 ships:
Saroula (Saroui), built in 1959 by	Ingalls SB, was Exxon Seattle - Esso Seattle, acquired in 1981, scrapped in 1984. type T5-S-41a 
Barbara Jane, built in 1959 by	Ingalls SB, became Baldbutte ,scrapped 1984, type T5-S-41a 
John Goode, a Z-ET1-S-C3 Liberty ship Tanker built by California Shipbuilding Corp, owned 1948 to 1954

World War II
Prudential Lines's fleet of ships were used to help the World War II effort. During World War II Prudential Lines operated Merchant navy ships for the United States Shipping Board. During World War II Prudential Lines was active with charter shipping with the Maritime Commission and War Shipping Administration. Prudential Lines operated Liberty ships for the merchant navy. The ship was run by its Prudential Lines crew and the US Navy supplied United States Navy Armed Guards to man the deck guns and radio.

Ships

Some ships owned
SS The Emerald cruise ship
SS Southstar, was USS Alamance
Lash Italia,
SS LASH Turkiye
Camp Fear, built in 1971. Lighter Aboard Ship (LASH) barge carrier
'Prudential Seajet, built in 1965
Prudential Oceanjet, built in 1965
Santa Magdalena
Santa Mercedes 
Santa Mariana 
Santa Maria
Five Surplus Victory Ships:
 Newberry Victory 
 San Angelo Victory  
 SS Attleboro Victory  
 Biddeford Victory  
 Moline Victory  
SS South Bend Victory,  operator 1950 to  1953 for Korean War
Liberty Ships:
 Sarah Orne Jewett  
 Patrick B. Whalen, renamed Bostonain in 1950,
 Belgian Liberty   
Richard Montgomery Liberty ship (operated from 1946 to 1952), sank in 1960.
Type C4-S-1A:
USS Paul Revere (APA-248)

World War II and post war operated ships:
Liberty Ships:
 Sarah Orne Jewett  
 Frank Adair Monroe  
 Frank P. Walsh   
Molly Pitcher On March 17, 1943 was torpedoed and sunk by German submarine U-521 in North Atlantic.
 
 Horace Williams 
 Charles Tufts  
SS George W. Norris
John E. Schmeltzer
Eastern Guide, Liberty ship
 SS New Bern Victory Troopship

See also

World War II United States Merchant Navy

References 

Defunct shipping companies of the United States
American companies established in 1933